Sir Nicholas Roger Kenyon CBE (born 23 February 1951, in Cheshire) is an English music administrator, editor and writer on music. He was responsible for the BBC Proms in 1996–2007, after which he was appointed Managing Director of the Barbican Centre. In September 2021 he left to become opera critic of the Telegraph and a visiting scholar in the Faculty of Music at the University of Cambridge.

Education and career

Having attended St Bede's College, Manchester and played bassoon with Stockport Youth Orchestra, Kenyon studied history at Balliol College, Oxford. 

After graduating, he worked for the English Bach Festival, and as a freelance writer on music. From 1979 to 1982 he was a music critic for The New Yorker. He then returned to the UK as the music critic for The Times, then chief music critic of The Observer. He was music editor of The Listener and editor of the journal Early Music.

In 1992, he was appointed Controller, BBC Radio 3 and director of the BBC Proms from the 1996 season, his title changing in 2000 to Controller BBC Proms, Live Events and Television Classical Music. In February 2007 he was announced as the new Managing Director of the Barbican Centre in the City of London, in succession to Sir John Tusa, a post he took up in October 2007, remaining until September 2021, when he became opera critic of the Telegraph and a visiting scholar at the Faculty of Music of Cambridge University.

Kenyon has been a member of the Board of Arts Council England, and previously of the Board of English National Opera, a Governor of the Guildhall School of Music and Drama, a member of the Arts and Humanities Research Council, a member of English Heritage's Blue Plaques Panel, a Trustee of the Dartington Hall Trust, a member of the Dartington International Summer School Foundation and a patron of Spode Music Week. He is also a Fellow of The Radio Academy.

Honours
In the 2001 New Year Honours, he was appointed a Commander of the Order of the British Empire (CBE) for his services to music and millennium broadcasting. He was created a Knight Bachelor in the 2008 New Year Honours. In 2011, he was awarded the President's Medal by the British Academy.

Publications
Amongst his publications are The BBC Symphony Orchestra: the first 50 years (1982), the biography Simon Rattle: from Birmingham to Berlin (2001), and the Faber Pocket Guide to Mozart (2005) and Faber Pocket Guide to Bach (2011).  He edited the influential Authenticity and Early Music (1987), and the BBC Proms Guides to Great Symphonies, Great Concertos, Great Choral Works and Great Orchestral works. In 2021 he published The Life of Music: New Adventures in the Western Classical Tradition (2021).

“Rule Britannia” discussion
In 2020 Kenyon commented on a controversy about whether Rule, Britannia! should be sung at the Last Night of the Proms. In recent years the inclusion of the song has been criticised because of its jingoistic words, for example by Leonard Slatkin, the second non-British person to conduct the Last Night of the Proms. In 2020 the BBC proposed to perform the music in the Royal Albert Hall without the words, citing the difficulties the traditional arrangement posed during the COVID-19 pandemic. Kenyon dismissed the criticism of this decision as "kneejerk" BBC bashing. In the end, there was a u-turn and the lyrics were sung after all.

References

External links
Guardian article by Kenyon on the influence of recording and broadcasting on musical tastes

1951 births
Alumni of Balliol College, Oxford
BBC music executives
People associated with the BBC Proms
BBC Radio 3 controllers
British music critics
Commanders of the Order of the British Empire
English music journalists
Honorary Members of the Royal Academy of Music
Knights Bachelor
Living people
People educated at St Bede's College, Manchester
Recipients of the President's Medal (British Academy)
Opera critics